John Ruddock (20 May 1897 – 24 September 1981) was a Peruvian-born British film and television actor.

John Ruddock was born on 20 May 1897 in Lima, Peru as John Reynolds Ruddock. He was the first of seven children of his British father and American mother. After the family returned to Britain he was sent to school at St. Lawrence College, Ramsgate, Kent from 1910 to 1914.

He worked briefly for an insurance company in Liverpool before volunteering to fight in the First World War. He was commissioned into the Royal Northumberland Fusiliers and saw action on the Somme and at Passchendaele. He was wounded several times and on one occasion was buried for fifteen hours as a result of an artillery bombardment. In the 1920s he attended the Royal College of Music and then the Royal Academy of Dramatic Art. He was in repertory in the 1930s and with the Shakespeare Memorial Theatre company at Stratford. During the Second World War he worked for the Entertainments National Service Association.

Further stage performances for the RSC after the war included John of Gaunt in Richard II and Shylock in The Merchant of Venice.

In the 1940s and 1950s he had some notable character roles in MGM period films. He also performed numerous roles for the BBC both on radio and television. These included appearances in A Christmas Carol, Dixon of Dock Green, The Avengers and finally in 1977 in the post-apocalyptic fiction series Survivors.

In his latter years he was a drama coach at the Guildford School of Acting. He died in 1981 in Guildford, Surrey, England.

Selected filmography

 Escape to Danger (1943) as Jim
 The Way Ahead (1944) as Chelsea Pensioner
 Strawberry Roan (1944) as John Dibben
 Waltz Time (1945) as Count Prohaska
 Pink String and Sealing Wax (1945) as Judge
 Lisbon Story (1946) as Pierre Sargon
 Night Boat to Dublin (1946) as Bowman
 Wanted for Murder (1946) as Glover 
 The Laughing Lady (1946) as Gilliatt
 Meet Me at Dawn (1947) as Doctor
 Frieda (1947) as Granger
 The Fallen Idol (1948) as Dr. Wilson
 Under Capricorn (1949) as Mr. Potter
 Quo Vadis (1951) as Chilo
 Secret People (1952) as Daly
 Ivanhoe (1952) as Hundebert
 Martin Luther  (1953) as Vicar von Staupitz
 Women Without Men (1956) as 3rd Policeman (uncredited)
 Lust for Life (1956) as Ducrucq
 [[ Treasure at the mill 1957. As Mr Wilson
 Question 7 (1961) as Martin Kraus, Küster
 The Avengers, Mr Teddy Bear (1962) as Dr James Howell
 Lawrence of Arabia (1962) as Elder Harith (uncredited)
 Chitty Chitty Bang Bang (1968) as Minister of Finance (uncredited)
 The Horsemen (1971) as Scribe
 Elizabeth R (1971, TV Series) as Archbishop Whitgift
 Survivors'' (1977, TV Series) as Bagley

References

External links

1897 births
1981 deaths
British male film actors
People from Lima
20th-century British male actors
Royal Northumberland Fusiliers officers
British Army personnel of World War I
Entertainments National Service Association personnel
British expatriates in Peru